Pa Kam-e Bala (also Romanized as Pā Kam-e Bālā) is a village in Mosaferabad Rural District, Rudkhaneh District, Rudan County, Hormozgan Province, Iran. At the 2006 census, its population was 21, in 5 families.

References 

Populated places in Rudan County